Matthew Medhurst (born 9 September 1983 from Pembury, Kent) is a former English–born Dutch professional darts player who competed in Professional Darts Corporation events.

Career

PDC
In January 2013, Medhurst took part in the PDC Qualifying School in an attempt to win a tour card. He was unsuccessful in doing so having failed to finish in the top 18 of the Q School order of merit.

BDO
In 2014 Matthew Medhurst won the Italian Grand Masters, he beat Marco Apollonio in the final. In 2015 Medhurst qualified for the 2016 BDO World Darts Championship by leading the Western Europe region, he will play Jeff Smith in the preliminary round. Matthew lost his preliminary match by a scoreline of 3–0 in sets.

World Championship results

BDO
 2016: Preliminary round (lost 0–3 to Jeff Smith)

References

External links
Matthew Medhurst on Darts Database

1983 births
Living people
Dutch darts players
British Darts Organisation players
People from Pembury